From 1990 to 1994, more LGBTQ characters appeared in anime than in Western animation. Most prominently, LGBTQ characters appeared in lesbian, bisexual, and genderqueer characters in Dear Brother, Sailor Moon, and Ai no Kusabi. In contrast, Gargoyles featured an array of gay, bisexual, and asexual characters. This trend would continue in the later 1990s, with more LGBTQ characters introduced in Western animation.

This list only includes recurring characters, otherwise known as supporting characters, which appear frequently from time to time during the series' run, often playing major roles in more than one episode, and those in the main cast are listed below. LGBTQ characters which are guest stars or one-off characters are listed on the pages focusing exclusively on gay (in animation and anime), lesbian (in animation and anime), bisexual (in animation and anime), trans, pansexual, asexual, non-binary, and intersex characters. 

For a further understanding of how these LGBTQ characters fit into the overall history of animation, see the History of LGBTQ characters in animated series: 1990s page.

The entries on this page are organized alphanumerically by duration dates and then alphabetically by the first letter of a specific series.

1990–1993

1994

Notes

See also

 List of yuri anime and manga
 List of LGBT-related films by year
 List of animated films with LGBT characters

References

1990s animated television series
1990s-related lists
Animated
Lists of animated series